The Monzeler Hüttenkopf, also just Hüttenkopf, at , is the second highest point of the  Moselle Hills. It lies within the municipality of Osann-Monzel in the German county of Bernkastel-Wittlich.

References 

Mountains and hills of the Eifel
Mountains and hills of Rhineland-Palatinate